Tania Paola Morales Bazarte (born 22 December 1986), known as Tania Morales, is a Mexican footballer who plays as a midfielder in the Liga MX Femenil and the Mexico national team. Internationally, she has represented Mexico's under-20 and senior teams.

From 2017 to 2021, she was a member of C. D. Guadalajara, nicknamed the Chivas and the Rebaño Sagrado, where she was the team's captain. In 2022 she was traded to Cruz Azul where she is also the captain.

Club career
Tania Morales was born in Guadalajara, Jalisco on 22 December 1986.

In 2017, Morales joined Guadalajara and was chosen as captain of the team for the inaugural season of the Liga MX Femenil. She scored seven goals and tallied two assists during the Apertura tournament. On 4 November 2017, Morales scored the first and only Olympic goal in the league.

The Chivas won the league championship on 24 November 2017 after defeating Pachuca in the second match of a two-match playoff. Morales had an assist in the victory. The matches drew record-setting crowds of 28,955 and 32,466 spectators.

In the Clausura 2018 tournament Morales scored five goals.

As of September 2020, Morales is the player who has made most appearances in Guadalajara history.

International career
Morales played for Mexico in the 2006 FIFA U-20 Women's World Championship contested in Russia, where the Mexican squad was eliminated at the group stage.

Playing for the Mexican senior team, on 2 April 2008, Morales scored two goals in a match with Jamaica as Mexico competed unsuccessfully to qualify for the 2008 Olympic Games. At the  2010 CONCACAF Women's Gold Cup, Morales played in all five matches as Mexico succeeded in qualifying for the 2011 FIFA Women's World Cup. At the Gold Cup, Morales was a substitute in the match against the United States on 5 November 2010 where Mexico won 2–1. U.S. Soccer called the match a "stunning upset" and the "biggest result in Mexican women's football history. Morales was a starter in a follow up game with against the United States on 5 June 2011 which Mexico lost 0–1. However, Morales, although a member of the Mexican team, did not play in the 2011 FIFA Women's World Cup.

On 27 November 2017, Morales was selected by the national team to participate in preparations for competing in the Central American and Caribbean Games in 2018. She also played one match with the national team in the 2018 Turkish Women's Cup in March 2018.

Career statistics

Club

Honours

Club
Guadalajara
 Liga MX Femenil: Apertura 2017

References

External links
 
 Tania Morales at C.D. Guadalajara Femenil 

1986 births
Living people
Mexican women's footballers
Footballers from Guadalajara, Jalisco
Liga MX Femenil players
C.D. Guadalajara (women) footballers
Mexico women's international footballers
Women's association football midfielders
20th-century Mexican women
21st-century Mexican women
Mexican footballers